Jarrod Michael Jablonski (born April 24, 1969) is a pioneering technical diver and record setting cave diver as well as an accomplished business owner and operator. These business operations include Halcyon Manufacturing, Extreme Exposure Adventure Center and Global Underwater Explorers. In July 2021 Jablonski launched and now operates the world's deepest pool at Deep Dive Dubai. Jablonski is one of the main architects behind the 'Doing It Right' (or DIR) system of diving.

Background
Jablonski was born on April 24, 1969, in West Palm Beach, Florida. He attended Forest Hill Community High School where he graduated in 1987. He then attended the University of Florida, graduating in 1992 with a degree in English and again in 1994 with a degree in Geology.

In 1984, Jablonski took his first recreational diving certification course. While in college, he decided to try cave diving and was certified in 1989. Also, in 1989 he became an open water instructor and currently holds certifications for GUE, NAUI, PADI, CMAS, YMCA and PDIC. He began his career as a cave diving instructor in 1990 and currently holds instructor trainer certifications for GUE, IANTD, NSS-CDS, and the NACD.

As of 2007, Jablonski served as a member of the Undersea and Hyperbaric Medical Society diving committee and helped shape guidance related to diving medical safety.

Jablonski became a fellow of The Explorers Club in 2008 and currently resides in Gainesville, Florida.

Career
Jablonski started teaching cave diving at Ginnie Springs in 1990 and continued there until 1996.

From 1993 to 1996, Jablonski was a scientific diver at the University of Florida supporting research on groundwater in the Santa Fe River Basin.

During this time, he also served on the board of directors for the National Association of Cave Diving (1995–1998) where he was also training director in 1997. Jablonski was also a board member for the National Speleological Society - Cave Diving Section (1996–1998) as well as serving on their training committee from 1995 to 1997. He was a member of the advisory board for the International Association of Nitrox and Technical Divers from 1996 to 1998.

As training director for the Woodville Karst Plain Project (WKPP), Jablonski saw a need to expand his role to benefit a larger population of divers. In 1998, Jablonski founded Global Underwater Explorers (GUE), a scuba diving organization that provides education within recreational, technical and cave diving. It is a not-for-profit, membership organization, based in High Springs, Florida, United States. Jablonski serves on the board of directors as the president and training director. When GUE was formed it was co-located with Extreme Exposure dive store that was also founded by Jablonski in 1998. However, Extreme Exposure has now changed locations, which has allowed for further growth of the organization.

Jablonski served on the board of directors for Florida Speleological Researcher, Inc from 1998 to 2002.

In 2000, Jablonski founded Halcyon Manufacturing and serves as president and Chief Executive Officer (CEO) of the company.

Expeditions and projects
Jablonski has been setting records for cave penetration for many years. In July 1998 Jablonski, again diving with Irvine and Scarabin traveled  in Wakulla Springs O-Tunnel. Jablonski and his regular dive buddy WKPP director Casey McKinlay set a world record for the longest ever penetration on a cave dive, at  while exploring "Q" tunnel of Wakulla Springs.
This record remains the longest penetration in a deep cave.

On May 20, 2007, Jablonski and McKinlay set off from Turner Sink to try to find a connection but were unable to when the cave became impassable after . On July 28, 2007, the divers explored  of new passage before discovering an exploration line from Wakulla Springs. This traverse took approximately 7 hours, followed by 14 hours of decompression. That dive established the Wakulla – Leon Sinks Cave System as the longest underwater cave in the United States and set another record as the longest cave diving traverse.

The Florida House of Representatives adopted a resolution in 2011 "...recognizing the Woodville Karst Plain Project for its outstanding contributions to the State of Florida through scientific research and its dedication and tireless efforts to promote the protection of the state's precious natural water resources" (HR9053). Jablonski was cited in the resolution for his part in the 2007 dive that connected the Wakulla Springs to Leon Sinks.

Publications

Books

Articles

Other

Awards
Jablonski is a member of the Explorers Club.

In April 2018, Divers Alert Network announced that Jarrod Jablonski is the 2018 DAN Rolex Diver of the Year.

References

External links
 Sterling divers - Jarrod Jablonski
 

1969 births
Living people
American underwater divers
American cavers
Cave diving explorers
Forest Hill Community High School alumni
Sportspeople from West Palm Beach, Florida
Pioneering technical divers
University of Florida alumni
Sportspeople from Gainesville, Florida
Fellows of the Explorers Club